Thomas Stelzer (born February 21, 1967 in Linz) is an Austrian politician who is serving as the current Governor of Upper Austria since 2017. Stelzer studied law at the Johannes Kepler University Linz from 1985 to 1990. Before becoming Governor, Stelzer was the Deputy Governor of Upper Austria from 2015 to 2017. He was a member of the Upper Austrian Parliament from 1997 to 2015.

He is Knight of Honor of the Order of St. George.

References 

Living people
1967 births
Johannes Kepler University Linz alumni
Governors of Upper Austria
Austrian People's Party politicians
Politicians from Linz